Haya Saleh Ibrahim (Arabic: هيا صالح)  is a Jordanian critic, novelist, playwright, drama writer and children's writer born in 1977, working in the Art House and as a critic and writer in the field of theatre and drama.

Education 
She holds a high school diploma in 1994 and a bachelor's degree in Arabic language and literature from Al-Bayt University in 1999.

Memberships and positions 

 Member of the Jordanian Writers Society.
 Member of the High Committee of the Jordanian Family Library/Ministry of Culture, 2018.
 Member of the jury of the Michel Sandaha Literary Creativity Competition, organized by the National Orthodox School, 2017.
 Member of the editorial board of the cultural magazine "Madarej".
 Member of the Special Committee for the Evaluation of the Creative Sabbatical Project/ Ministry of Culture, 2017.
 Member of the jury of the third session of the Reader's Young Talented Writers Award, 2017.
 Member of the Jury of the Khalil Al-Sakini Award for Children's Literature/Jordanian Writers Association, 2016.
 Member of the jury of the "Heck Ahla" children's competition (Story Field) organized by the Directorate of Culture in Greater Amman Secretariat, 2014.
 Honorary Member of Naji Noman House of Culture, Beirut, 2013.
 Member of the Manuscript Evaluation Committee of the Jordanian Ministry of Culture (2012).
 Member of the Manuscript Evaluation Committee of the Greater Amman Secretariat, 2010/11.
 Member of the editorial board of Wissam Children's Magazine, Ministry of Culture, 2009-2011.
 Member of the Arab Internet Writers Union (and member of its Administrative Committee in Jordan), 2007/08.
 Member of the jury at the Irbid City of Jordanian Culture/Children's Literature Competition, 2007.

Publications

Children's books 
 "Fruit Cake", Stories, Ministry of Culture, Amman, 2006. i2, Ministry of Culture, Amman, 2010.
 "Selma and the Larvae", Illustrated Story, Ministry of Culture, Amman, 2009.
 "The Grape Basket", Tales of Peoples' Heritage Translated from English, Jordanian Press Foundation (Al-Rai), Amman, 2010. i2, Ministry of Culture, Amman, 2012.
 "Why are dogs chasing cats?" Tales of the Heritage of the Peoples, Greater Amman Secretariat, Amman, 2011.
 "Biography of a Paper", Illustrated Story, Ministry of Culture, Amman, 2012. i2, Ministry of Culture, Amman, 2013.
 "Little Shamma in Big Trouble", a story (in the book "Naji Noman Literary Awards", Beirut, 2013).
 "Light Soil", boys' novel, Department of Culture and Media, Sharjah, 2013.
 "A Small World", Illustrated Story, Dar Kalimat, Sharjah, 2014.
 "Tarek Painting", Children's Illustrated Story, Greater Amman Secretariat, Amman, 2015.
 "I have the right to", theatrical text (in the book "Theatrical Texts 5", Arab Theatre Commission, Sharjah, 2014).
 "Little Shamma in Big Trouble," Children's Photo Story, Ministry of Culture, Amman, 2016.
 "Why I Love Reading," Children's Video Story, Garden House, Beirut, 2016.
 I'm not ruining it. I Draw, Children's Illustrated Story, Department of Culture, Sharjah, 2017.

Literary criticism books 

 "Narrative of Life", Readings in Arabic Fiction and Stories, Arab Press Agency, Cairo, 2010.
 "Reference and Shadows", Articles in Novels from Jordan, Ministry of Culture, Amman, 2010.
 "Self-deprecation", Articles in contemporary Jordanian story, Nara Publishing and Distribution House, Amman, 2006. i2, Arab Press Agency, Cairo, 2012.
 "Memory Doors", Articles in Arab Story Experiences, Ministry of Culture, Amman, 2013.
 "Distance Zero: Novel clashes and life", articles in Arabic fiction experiences, Andalusian Cultural Salon and Now Publishers and Distributors, Montreal/Canada and Oman, 2014.

Awards 

 Katara Prize for Arabic Fiction, for her novel "Another Color of The Sunset" (2018).
 Jordanian State Award in Children's Literature (2017).
 Nasser al-Din al-Assad Award for Critical Studies awarded by the Jordanian Writers Society for her book Distance Zero. Novel clashes and life" (2016).
 Her theatrical text "In the Hands of a Star" received the highest rating from the High Advisory Committee on the Selection of Texts participating in the Childish Creativity Festival, Ministry of Culture, Amman, 2016.
 "In the Hands of a Star" (text by her author) won the best integrated performance award from the Childish Creativity Festival organized by the Ministry of Culture, Amman, 2016.
 Her book Biography of a Paper won the Best Arab Book for Children award, Sharjah, United Arab Emirates, 2013.
 The manuscript of her story, "Little Shama in Big Trouble", won the Literary Creativity Award, Naji Noman Foundation for Culture, Beirut, 2013.
 Her child-oriented text "It's my right to" won the Children's Theatre Text Competition (3rd place), Arab Theatre Authority, Sharjah, 2013.
 The episode of the "Sanabel Magazine" programme, prepared for children and broadcast by Jordanian radio, won the golden prize at the Radio and Television Festival, Tunisia, 2009

References 

Jordanian writers
Jordanian women writers
Jordanian novelists
Jordanian women novelists
Critics
Arab writers
1977 births
Living people